Malo Selo may refer to the following places:

 Malo Selo, Glamoč, village in the municipality of Glamoč, Bosnia and Herzegovina
 Malo Selo, Bulgaria, village in Bulgaria
 Malo Selo, Croatia, a village near Delnice